The Denmark national under-17 football team represents Denmark in international football at this age level and is controlled by the Danish Football Association, the governing body for football in Denmark. It was founded in 1964 as an under-16 team. In 2001, it was changed to an under-17 team.

Competitive record
The Danish under-17 squad made its World Cup debut at the 2011 FIFA U-17 World Cup in Mexico.

FIFA U-16 and U-17 World Cup

Under-16 era

*Draws also include penalty shootouts, regardless of the outcome.

Under-17 era

*Draws also include penalty shootouts, regardless of the outcome.

UEFA European Under-16 and Under-17 Championship

Under-16 era

*Draws also include penalty shootouts, regardless of the outcome.

Under-17 era

*Draws also include penalty shootouts, regardless of the outcome.

Recent results

2017

Results in 2017

2018

Results in 2018

2019

Results in 2019

Current squad
 The following players were called up for the 2023 UEFA European Under-17 Championship qualification matches.
 Match dates: 26 October – 1 November 2022
 Opposition: ,  and 
Caps and goals correct as of: 24 September 2022, after the match against

Recent callups

Head coaches
 1971:  Max Rasmussen
 1972:  Bent Dahl
 1973–1979:  Hardy Gynild
 1980–1981:  Kaj Christensen
 1982:  Hans Brun Larsen
 1983:  Per Simonsen
 1984–1987:  Kim Splidsboel
 1987–1996:  Poul Erik Bech
 1996–2006:  Hans Brun Larsen
 2006–2008:  Glen Riddersholm
 2008–2012:  Thomas Frank
 2012–2016:  Jan Michaelsen
 2016:  Per Holm
 2017:  Claus Nørgaard
 2017–2018:  Michael Pedersen
 2018–2020:  Søren Hermansen
 2020-present:  Kenneth Weber

See also
 Denmark men's national football team
 Denmark men's national under-21 football team
 Denmark men's national under-19 football team
 Denmark women's national football team
 Denmark women's national under-19 football team
 Denmark women's national under-17 football team

References

European national under-17 association football teams
under-17